is a Japanese tokusatsu TV show being the 16th show in the Ultra Series. Produced by Tsuburaya Productions, Ultraman Cosmos aired from July 6, 2001 to September 27, 2002, with a total of 65 episodes, which currently makes it the longest running Ultra show to date. It was also released to celebrate the 35th anniversary of the Ultraman series.

In June 2002, Cosmos was taken off of television for several weeks (following the broadcast of the 49th episode) when lead actor Taiyou Sugiura was questioned in an assault and extortion case. When the case against Sugiura was dropped for lack of evidence, Cosmos was put back on the air. TBS and Tsuburaya ultimately pulled five episodes (50, 52, 54, 56, and 58) from broadcast to make up for time lost, and these episodes were later released on DVD.

In April 2017, the television channel TOKU announced that they would release the series in the United States in the near future. A year later, the series was released by the channel on April 23, 2018.

Story concepts
Observing the increasing trend of violence that occurred in the younger generation of Japan, Tsuburaya made an Ultraman character that has a gentler nature than its predecessors. With a dominantly blue look, Tsuburaya wanted to elevate Ultraman's image as a figure of love for the environment and peace. Thus, the concept of the story is the theme of pacifism, meaning an idea which considers war to be morally unjustifiable, and all disputes or disagreements must be resolved by the way of peace. So Ultraman Cosmos is a gentle Ultraman, engaging in nonviolent fights.

Plot

The series featured many firsts for the franchise, including the start of the story in a movie rather than the series proper. Ultraman Cosmos: The First Contact was the prequel to the series and took place eight years before episode 1. In it, 11-year-old Musashi Haruno encounters the being of light, and befriends him as the two confront a threat to Earth.

Ten years later, Musashi, now 19 and a member of Team EYES, once again encounters the being of light from his childhood. The dark being Chaos Header has appeared and is corrupting the monsters of Earth, making them become ravenous and violent creatures that threaten humanity. Through Musashi's will to see the beasts and humans live in peace, Cosmos grants him a new power that will allow him to heal the corrupted creatures.

Episodes

Cast
 : , 
: 
: 
: 
: 
: 
: 
/ (Voice): 
: 
: 
: 
: 
: 
: 
: 
: 
: 
, Evacuees (1): 
, : 
Narrator, TV announcer (Voice; 6):

Guest cast

Sosuke Nagano's father (7): 
: 
: 
: 
: 
: 
: 
: 
: 
: 
: 
:

Songs
Opening theme
 "Spirit"
 Lyrics: Goro Matsui
 Composition: KATSUMI
 Arrangement: Takao Konishi
 Artist: Project DMM

Ending themes
 
 Lyrics: Goro Matsui
 Composition: Kisaburo Suzuki
 Arrangement: Seiichi Kyoda
 Artist: Project DMM
 
 Lyrics, Composition: KATSUMI
 Arrangement: Kazuya Daimon
 Artist: Project DMM

Media

Feature films
 Ultraman Cosmos: The First Contact (2001)
 Ultraman Cosmos 2: The Blue Planet (2002)
 Ultraman Cosmos vs. Ultraman Justice: The Final Battle (2003)

Other appearances
 Mega Monster Battle: Ultra Galaxy (2009), an alternate iteration of Musashi makes a cameo appearance as a ZAP Spacy member.
 Ultraman Saga (2012), Cosmos joins Ultraman Zero, Ultraman Dyna and five Showa-era Ultra Heroes.
 Ultraman Ginga S: Showdown! Ultra 10 Warriors!! (2015), Cosmos joins Ultraman Ginga, and eight Heisei-era Ultra Heroes.
 Ultraman Orb: The Origin Saga (2016-2017), Musashi joins Ultraman Orb and Ultraman Dyna.
 Ultra Galaxy Fight: The Absolute Conspiracy (2020), Cosmos along with Justice joins Ultraman 80, Ultraman Neos and Ultraseven 21 at Planet Feed to fight against Leugocyte.

Home media
In July 2020, Shout! Factory announced to have struck a multi-year deal with Alliance Entertainment and Mill Creek, with the blessings of Tsuburaya and Indigo, that granted them the exclusive SVOD and AVOD digital rights to the Ultra series and films (1,100 TV episodes and 20 films) acquired by Mill Creek the previous year. Ultraman Cosmos, amongst other titles, will stream in the United States and Canada through Shout! Factory TV and Tokushoutsu.

The series is scheduled to be released in the United States on DVD November 1, 2022 by Mill Creek Entertainment.

References

 
2001 Japanese television series debuts
2002 Japanese television series endings
Ultra television series
Mainichi Broadcasting System original programming
TBS Television (Japan) original programming